Atomic Liquors is a bar in Las Vegas, Nevada. Opened in 1952, it became the first business in Las Vegas to be given a tavern license to sell liquor and operate an onsite bar.

History

Stella and Joe Sobchick opened Virginia's Café in 1945 on Fremont Street in Las Vegas. In 1952, the Sobchicks closed the restaurant and reopened the building as Atomic Liquors.

They were given the first tavern license in Las Vegas, meaning they could operate a bar and also sell liquor to go. They opened the bar and liquor store due to increased demand for liquor as a result of the growth of the Nevada Test Site. The bar was open 24 hours a day. Eventually, they expanded the bar to have a rooftop seating area, where customers could watch the atomic testing 65 miles away while drinking. 

The Sobchicks operated the bar until they died in 2010. Their son, Ron Sobchick, operated the bar. In 2011, the bar closed. In 2012, it was purchased by brothers Kent Johns, a commercial real estate broker, and Lance Johns, an attorney, and Derek Stoneberger. 

Famous people who have visited the bar include Bugsy Siegel, The Smothers Brothers, The Rat Pack, Hunter S. Thompson, Roy Rogers, Bradley Cooper, Clint Eastwood, Burt Reynolds, Robert De Niro, and Barbra Streisand. A bar stool with a star on it sits at the end of the inside bar, the preferred seat of Barbra Streisand when she visited regularly. Atomic Liquors has appeared in The Hangover, Casino, and The Twilight Zone. Anthony Bourdain filmed a segment of his show Parts Unknown at the bar in 2013.

References

External links

Atomic Liquors in Las Vegas from the National Trust for Historic Preservation

Buildings and structures in Las Vegas
Commercial buildings completed in 1945
1945 establishments in Nevada
1952 establishments in Nevada
Bars (establishments)